The Iowa Alliance Conference is a high school athletic conference whose members are mostly located in the metropolitan areas of central Iowa, with five of the schools being from the Des Moines Independent Community School District.

The conference includes 11 schools and is divided into 2 divisions: North and South. 10 of the 11 schools are formerly of the Central Iowa Metro League.

Member schools

History
On March 1, 2021, ten high schools made the announcement to leave the Central Iowa Metro League (CIML) and form a new conference. These schools include Ames, Fort Dodge, Marshalltown, Mason City, and Ottumwa, as well as the five public Des Moines schools (East, Hoover, Lincoln, North, and Roosevelt). The schools left the CIML in the spring of 2021 to create a new conference. The withdrawal is due to a low percentage in wins from the non-suburban schools in the conference. The new conference was announced on November 19, 2021, and included Waterloo East High School, joining from the Mississippi Valley Conference (Iowa).

Due to the size of the schools and proximity, games will still be routinely scheduled with the members whom remained in the CIML, while allowing scheduling with other schools they did not have space in their schedule for.

Mason City dropped the mascot "Mohawks" in November 2021, citing an effort to rid the district of a symbol that exploited Native American tribal imagery. The Meskwaki and Akwesasne Nations had voiced objections to the mascot. On March 22, 2022, it was revealed the new mascot for Mason City would be the "River Hawks". The name was chosen by vote over "Majors" and "Monarchs", which were narrowed down from over 300 submissions.

Sports
The conference offers the following sports: 

 Fall — volleyball, boys' cross-country, girls' cross-country, boys' golf and girls' swimming.
 Winter — Boys' basketball, girls' basketball, bowling, wrestling and boys' swimming.
 Spring — Boys' track and field, girls' track and field, boys' soccer, girls' soccer, boys' tennis, girls' tennis and girls' golf.
 Summer — Baseball and softball.

All the member schools field a varsity football team, however it is not sponsored by any conference in Iowa. Football is played in a separate classification system, and competition is organized by districts.

Although the member schools field freshman — and in some cases, junior varsity — teams in many of the above-mentioned sports, conference championships are determined at sophomore and varsity levels only.

References 

High school sports in Iowa
High school sports conferences and leagues in the United States
Sports leagues established in 2021
2021 establishments in Iowa